The 1996–97 College of Charleston Cougars men's basketball team represented the College of Charleston in the 1996–97 NCAA Division I men's basketball season. The Cougars, led by 18th-year head coach John Kresse, played their home games at F. Mitchell Johnson Arena in Charleston, South Carolina as members of the Trans America Athletic Conference.

After finishing the regular season conference schedule unbeaten (16–0), the Cougars would also win the 1997 TAAC tournament to earn an automatic bid to the NCAA tournament as No. 12 seed in the Southeast region. College of Charleston beat No. 5 seed Maryland in the opening round before falling to eventual National champion Arizona in the second round, 73–69. The team set a school record for wins in a season and finished with an overall record of 29–3 as well as a No. 16 ranking in the season’s final AP poll.

The Charleston senior class finished with a four-year record of 101–17.

Roster

Schedule and results 

|-
!colspan=12 style=| Regular season

|-
!colspan=12 style=| TAAC tournament
|-

|-
!colspan=12 style=| NCAA Tournament

Source

Rankings

Awards and honors
Anthony Johnson – TAAC Player of the Year
John Kresse – TAAC Coach of the Year

NBA draft

References

College of Charleston Cougars men's basketball seasons
College of Charleston Cougars
College of Charleston
College of Charleston Cougars men's basketball
College of Charleston Cougars men's basketball